Chatriyan is a 1990 Indian Tamil-language crime drama film, written and produced by Mani Ratnam under Aalayam Productions. The film was directed by K. Subash, an assistant of Mani Ratnam. The film stars Vijayakanth, Bhanupriya and Thilakan, while Revathi made a guest appearance as Vijayakanth's wife. The film has Vijayakanth playing Selvam, an honest cop and Thilakan as Annachi, a corrupt politician and the antagonist.

This film ran more than 150 days in some theatres and was declared a blockbuster at the box office. The film is one of the biggest hit films of the early 1990s and has attained cult status. The film features a highly acclaimed soundtrack and background score composed by Ilaiyaraaja.

Plot
ACP Panneer Selvam aka Sathriyan is an honest cop, who gathers enough evidence against a local goon named Arumai Nayagam aka Annachi for illegal activities. Annachi is sent to prison, but avenges his arrest by killing Sathriyan's wife Jaya. Since then, Sathriyan quits the police force and takes care of his children, renting an apartment owned by V. K. Ramasamy. Banu, the apartment owner's granddaughter, gets introduced to Sathriyan's children and starts mingling with them, eventually falling in love with Sathriyan.

Meanwhile, Annachi is released from prison and realises that he does not carry the same respect as he used to before going to jail. Annachi challenges Sathriyan to join the police and fight him again. Sathriyan initially rejects the offer. Annachi tries to provoke Sathriyan by attacking his home and son. Out of frustration over his son's attack, Sathriyan joins the police and fights Annachi. Sathriyan's fight against Annachi forms the rest of the plot.

Cast
 Vijayakanth as ACP Panneer Selvam, a juvenile prisoner who is raised by a short-tempered police officer into an aggressive and ruthless police officer
 Bhanupriya as Banu, a young woman who despite initially being irritated by Selvam falls in love with the latter
 Revathi as Jaya, Selvam's wife who gets killed in a blast meant for him (Guest appearance)
 V. K. Ramasamy as Banu's grandfather and owner of Selvam's house
 Thilakan as Arumai Nayagam (Annachi), an influential criminal who is humiliated and jailed by Selvam.
 A. V. Ramanan as Assistant Superinteendent of Police Ramanan
 Vijayakumar as Selvam's godfather and guardian who raises him after he escapes from the juvenile home to kill those who are responsible for his parents' death
 Delhi Ganesh as Jaya's father
 Ajay Rathnam as John Swaminathan
 Veeraraghavan
 Kutty Padmini
 Baby Aarthi as Preethi
 Master Vishnuvardhan as Young Panneer Selvam

Production 
Chatriyan is the first film produced by Aalayam Productions.

Soundtrack
The music was scored by Ilaiyaraaja, with lyrics written by Vaali. The song "Maalayil Yaaro" is set in Suddhadhanyasi raga.

Track listing

Release and reception
Chathriyan was released on 17 October 1990 alongside other major releases including Michael Madana Kama Rajan, Mallu Vetti Minor, Avasara Police 100, Sirayil Sila Raagangal , En Kadhal Kanmani , Amman Kovil Thiruvizha and   Pudhupaattu, but ran for over 150 days in theatres despite stiff competition. C. R. K. of Kalki praised the film for crisp dialogues, subtle emotions and cinematography.

References

External links 

1990 crime drama films
1990 films
1990s Tamil-language films
Fictional portrayals of the Tamil Nadu Police
Films directed by K. Subash
Films scored by Ilaiyaraaja
Indian crime drama films
Indian nonlinear narrative films